James R. "Duke" Aiona Jr. (born June 8, 1955) is an American politician and jurist who served as the eleventh lieutenant governor of Hawaii under Linda Lingle from 2002 to 2010. A Republican, he also served both as an attorney and a judge for the state prior to becoming lieutenant governor.

Aiona was the Republican nominee for Governor of Hawaii in the 2010 election, but was defeated by Democrat Neil Abercrombie in the general election. He was the Republican nominee once again in the 2014 election, but lost to Democrat David Ige, since which he has done legal work and consulting. In June 2022, Aiona announced that he would run again for a third time in the Republican nomination for the 2022 election, which he lost to Democrat Josh Green, the incumbent Hawaii Lieutenant Governor. Aiona said he ran again due to "lack of a moral compass" and because basic issues have worsened without civility and transparency. As of 2023, he is the most recent Republican to serve as Lieutenant Governor of Hawaii.

Background
James Aiona was born in Pearl City, Hawaiʻi. He is of Hawaiian and Portuguese descent on his father's side and Chinese on his mother's side. His mother worked as an elementary school teacher and his father worked as a life insurance agent. He attended Saint Louis School, a local academy of the Diocese of Honolulu. Upon graduating high school, Aiona played basketball at University of the Pacific in Stockton, California and pursued a bachelor of arts degree in political science, which he received from there in 1977. Aiona returned to Hawaiʻi and graduated from the William S. Richardson School of Law at the University of Hawaiʻi at Mānoa in 1981.

He began his legal career at the City and County of Honolulu as a deputy prosecutor, and was appointed to the Hawaiʻi State Judiciary in 1990 as a Family Court judge. In 1996, while serving as Circuit Court judge, Aiona became the first administrative judge and primary architect of the Drug Court Program in Hawaiʻi. The program gives non-violent offenders a chance to stay out of prison through active and effective drug rehabilitation.

In 1977, while attending law school, he met Vivian Welsh at a dance in Waikīkī. They married in 1981. They have two sons, Kulia and Makana; and two daughters, Ohulani and Kaimilani.
As lieutenant governor, Aiona was paid $117,312 per annum.

Electoral history
 
Aiona and Governor Linda Lingle became Hawaii's first Republican administration to win a second term, and they won with the largest margin of victory in any gubernatorial race in the history of the state. Aiona ran to succeed Lingle as governor in 2010, but lost to Neil Abercrombie; he ran for governor again in 2014, losing to Democrat David Ige.

See also 
 List of minority governors and lieutenant governors in the United States

References

External links

James Aiona for Governor official campaign site 
Official Facebook

|-

|-

1955 births
Living people
20th-century American lawyers
21st-century American politicians
American jurists of Chinese descent
American people of Native Hawaiian descent
American people of Portuguese descent
American prosecutors
Candidates in the 2010 United States elections
Candidates in the 2014 United States elections
City and town attorneys in the United States
Hawaii people of Chinese descent
Hawaii people of Portuguese descent
Hawaii politicians of Chinese descent
Hawaii Republicans
Hawaii state court judges
Lieutenant Governors of Hawaii
Native Hawaiian politicians
Politicians from Honolulu
Saint Louis School alumni
People from Pearl City, Hawaii
Asian conservatism in the United States
University of the Pacific (United States) alumni
William S. Richardson School of Law alumni